The Next Maharashtra Legislative assembly election is scheduled to be held in or before October 2024 to elect all 288 members of the state's Legislative Assembly.

Background

The previous Assembly elections were held in October 2019. The Bharatiya Janata Party led alliance NDA got a clear majority to form government but due to internal conflict, Shiv Sena left the alliance (NDA) and form a new alliance with Nationalist Congress Party and Indian National Congress called MVA and form the state government, with Uddhav Thackeray becoming chief minister. After 2022 Maharashtra political crisis, Eknath Shinde along with 40 MLAs formed government with BJP. Eknath Shinde became the new chief minister.

Schedule

Parties and alliances







References 

State Assembly elections in Maharashtra
M